"Addio, addio" ("Farewell, Farewell") was the  entry in the Eurovision Song Contest 1962, performed in Italian by Claudio Villa.

With music by Domenico Modugno and lyrics by Franco Migliacci (the same duo had collaborated on Modugno's previous entry "Nel blu dipinto di blu"), the song is a ballad, in which Villa attempts to deal with the end of a relationship. He sings that "our love has become salt like sea water / our parched lips don't have words any longer", but clings to the hope that "it isn't true that our love has ended", indeed even as he farewells his former lover for the last time he sings "we love each other and that we're breaking up".

The song was performed fifteenth on the night, following 's Camillo Felgen with "Petit bonhomme" and preceding 's François Deguelt with "Dis rien". At the close of voting, it had received 3 points, placing 9th in a field of 16. The comparatively high place for a low-scoring song is partly explained by the fact that four entries at this Contest failed to record a point.

It was succeeded as Italian representative at the 1963 contest by Emilio Pericoli with "Uno per tutte".

Charts

References

Songs about parting
Eurovision songs of Italy
Eurovision songs of 1962
Sanremo Music Festival songs
Songs with lyrics by Franco Migliacci
1962 songs